Kahawamys is an extinct genus of thryonomyoid rodent which existed in Nsungwe Formation, Tanzania during the late Oligocene. It was first named by Nancy J. Stevens, Patricia A. Holroyd, Eric M. Roberts, Patrick M. O'connor and Michael D. Gottfried in 2009 and the type species is Kahawamys mbeyaensis.

References

Oligocene rodents
Fossil taxa described in 2009
Oligocene mammals of Africa